Ahmed Mazen Alghamdi (born 20 September 2001) is a Saudi Arabian professional footballer who plays as a midfielder for Al-Ettifaq.

Club career

Early career
Before turning pro, Alghamdi spent several years with Blaise Soccer Elite Academy in Vancouver. Alghamdi joined Vancouver Metro Soccer League side Rino's Vancouver SC as a fourteen-year-old and played three seasons of senior amateur soccer with the club's Rino's Tigers team while playing with Blaise Academy in the summer.

Pacific FC
On 1 May 2019, Alghamdi made his professional debut for Canadian Premier League side Pacific FC, and was officially announced as a signing two days later. He scored his first professional goal on July 1 against Cavalry FC. On 23 January 2020, the club announced it would allow Alghamdi to pursue playing opportunities in Saudi Arabia.

Al-Ettifaq
In January 2020, Alghamdi signed a five-year contract with Saudi Professional League side Al-Ettifaq. He made his debut for Al-Ettifaq against Al-Qadsiah on April 10, 2021.

International career
Because of his dual nationality, he is available to represent his country birth Saudi Arabia or his adopted country Canada.

In July 2018, Alghamdi was called up by the Saudi Arabia U-19 team for an evaluation camp ahead of the 2018 AFC U-19 Championship, but was not selected for the final squad. In July 2019, Alghamdi was called up by the Saudi Arabia U-20 team for a pair of friendlies against Bahrain and Tajikistan.

In November 2019, Alghamdi was called up for the 2020 AFC U-19 Championship qualification tournament. On 6 November, he started and scored a penalty for Saudi Arabia in a 1–0 win over Afghanistan. On 8 November, he came on as a substitute in a 4–0 win over India.

Alghamdi was called up to the Saudi Arabia U-23 team for the first time in 2022 for the 2022 AFC U-23 Asian Cup. Alghamdi started in the final and scored the first goal in the 48' minute to give the falcons the lead, the match ended 2-0 and Saudi Arabia won their first AFC U-23 Asian Cup title.

Honours

International
Saudi Arabia U23
AFC U-23 Asian Cup: 2022
WAFF U-23 Championship: 2022
WAFF U-23 Championship Best Player:
2022

References

External links

2001 births
Living people
Association football midfielders
Sportspeople from Jeddah
Soccer players from Vancouver
Saudi Arabian footballers
Saudi Arabia youth international footballers
Canadian soccer players
Saudi Arabian emigrants to Canada
Naturalized citizens of Canada
Pacific FC players
Ettifaq FC players
Canadian Premier League players
Saudi Professional League players